The Brussels International Festival of Eroticism (Dutch: Internationaal Erotica Festival van Brussel, French: Festival International de l'Érotisme de Bruxelles) is a trade show for the European adult entertainment industry held each February in Brussels. The most notable event during the Festival is the European X Awards, a movie award for the European adult video industry.

Each participating country (typically Germany, Italy, France and Spain) is given their own set of awards, including Best Movie, Best Director, Best Actor and Best Actress.

The first International Festival of Eroticism was held in 1993, with the European X Awards first held in 1995.

See also

 Barcelona International Erotic Film Festival
 Hot d'Or
 Venus Awards

References

External links
 Brussels Erotic Film Festival (Partial list of winners at IMDb)
  (2004 European X Award Nominees & Winners)
 "Adult actresses or Businesswomen ?" by Don Fernando, Adult DVD Talk, March 17, 2005. (Adult DVD Talk Forum Post listing the 2005 X Award Winners.)
 Images from the 15th Annual Brussels International Festival of Eroticism

Pornographic film awards
Sex industry in Europe
1993 establishments in Belgium
Festivals in Belgium
Culture in Brussels
Recurring events established in 1993
Annual events in Brussels
Sex festivals
Festivals established in 1993
Winter events in Belgium